Pattanagere is a town and a city municipal council in Chikkamagaluru district in the Indian state of Karnataka.

Demographics
 India census, Pattanagere had a population of 95,769. Males constitute 53% of the population and females 47%. Pattanagere has an average literacy rate of 69%, higher than the national average of 59.5%: male literacy is 74%, and female literacy is 63%. In Pattanagere, 12% of the population is under 6 years of age.

References

Cities and towns in Chikkamagaluru district